The Sopranos is a 1998 novel by Scottish writer Alan Warner. It won the Saltire Society's 1998 Scottish Book of the Year Award.

The novel was adapted by Lee Hall with the title Our Ladies of Perpetual Succour for a National Theatre of Scotland and Live Theatre, Newcastle, tour in 2015. 

The novel has been adapted by Alan Sharp and Michael Caton-Jones for the screen titled Our Ladies and released in 2019 and directed by Michael Caton-Jones.

Notes

External links
Review in The Richmond Review

Scottish novels
1998 British novels
Novels by Alan Warner
Novels set in Edinburgh
British novels adapted into plays
British novels adapted into films
Jonathan Cape books